Eduard "Edu" Oriol Gràcia (born 5 November 1986) is a Spanish professional footballer who plays for Atlético Sanluqueño CF as a winger.

Club career
Born in Cambrils, Tarragona, Catalonia, Oriol started playing with amateurs CF Pobla de Mafumet, having a loan spell with CF Reus Deportiu whilst on contract with the former. In the 2008–09 season, still in his native region, he competed in the Segunda División B with UE Sant Andreu.

Oriol moved to FC Barcelona in the summer of 2009, helping the reserves return to the Segunda División by appearing in 29 games and scoring three goals. After once again featuring heavily for Barça B in the 2010–11 campaign, as the team finished in third position – being however ineligible for playoff promotion – he signed for La Liga club Real Zaragoza for three years.

Oriol made his debut in the top flight on 28 August 2011, coming on as a second-half substitute in a 0–6 home loss against Real Madrid. He joined Azerbaijan Premier League's Khazar Lankaran FK in late August 2013 on a two-year contract, following the Aragonese's relegation, and won his first piece of silverware on 23 October after helping his new team to victory over Neftchi Baku PFC, in that year's Azerbaijan Supercup.

On 13 January 2014 Oriol's contract with Khazar was cancelled by mutual consent, after he failed to settle in Azerbaijan. The following day, he penned a two-year deal with AEL Limassol in the Cypriot First Division.

On 18 August 2014, Oriol agreed to a one-year contract with the option of a further year with Football League Championship side Blackpool, linking up with his twin brother Joan. His contract was terminated by mutual consent on 12 January 2015, and he moved to the Romanian Liga I with FC Rapid București.

Oriol subsequently returned to his homeland and its second tier, featuring rarely for UE Llagostera and CD Tenerife. In late November 2017 the 31-year-old signed with amateurs UD Ibiza, leaving at the end of the season.

Personal life
Oriol's twin brother, Joan, was also a footballer. A defender, he shared teams with his sibling on several occasions.

Career statistics

Honours
Khazar
Azerbaijan Supercup: 2013

References

External links

1986 births
Living people
People from Baix Camp
Spanish twins
Twin sportspeople
Sportspeople from the Province of Tarragona
Spanish footballers
Footballers from Catalonia
Association football wingers
La Liga players
Segunda División players
Segunda División B players
Tercera División players
Primera Federación players
CF Pobla de Mafumet footballers
CF Reus Deportiu players
UE Sant Andreu footballers
FC Barcelona Atlètic players
Real Zaragoza players
UE Costa Brava players
CD Tenerife players
UD Ibiza players
Atlético Sanluqueño CF players
Azerbaijan Premier League players
Khazar Lankaran FK players
Cypriot First Division players
AEL Limassol players
English Football League players
Blackpool F.C. players
Liga I players
FC Rapid București players
Spanish expatriate footballers
Expatriate footballers in Azerbaijan
Expatriate footballers in Cyprus
Expatriate footballers in England
Expatriate footballers in Romania
Spanish expatriate sportspeople in Azerbaijan
Spanish expatriate sportspeople in Cyprus
Spanish expatriate sportspeople in England
Spanish expatriate sportspeople in Romania